DNA-damage-inducible transcript 4 (DDIT4) protein also known as protein regulated in development and DNA damage response 1 (REDD1) is a protein that in humans is encoded by the DDIT4 gene.

Function 

DDIT4 acts as a negative regulator of mTOR, a serine/threonine kinase that regulates a variety of cellular functions such as growth, proliferation and autophagy. In particular, upregulation of HIF-1 in response to hypoxia upregulates DDIT4, leading to activation of Tsc1/2 via 14–3–3 shuttling and subsequent downregulation of mTOR via Rheb. In addition to hypoxia, DDIT4 expression has also been shown to be activated by DNA damage and energy stress.

Clinical significance 

Clinical interest in DDIT4 is based primarily on its effect on mTOR, which has been associated with aging and linked with diseases such as tuberous sclerosis, lymphangioleiomyomatosis, diabetes, and cancer. In particular, the overactivation of mTOR in many cancer types has led to the development of mTOR inhibitors for cancer treatment.  DDIT4 has begun to receive attention in this regard via the diabetes drug Metformin which has been shown to reduce cancer risk and increase DDIT4 expression.

See also 

 HIF1A
 Tuberous sclerosis protein
 MTOR
 14-3-3 protein
 DDIT4L/ REDD2

References

Further reading